Lucipara Islands are about 50 km west of Penyu Islands, both of which belong to Molucca Islands.  They are directly south of Manipa Strait (Selat Manipa) near Ceram.

Edmund Roberts visited the islands briefly in the 19th century. He called them Lucepara in his 1832 journal.

References

Archipelagoes of Indonesia